Ajami-ye Kallehbuz (also Romanized as ‘Ajamī-ye Kallehbūz and Ajamī Kolahbūz; also known as Kallehbūz ‘Ajamī and Kalleh Būz-e ‘Ajamī) is a village in Kolah Boz-e Gharbi Rural District, in the Central District of Meyaneh County, East Azerbaijan Province, Iran. At the 2006 census, its population was 290, in 47 families.

References 

Populated places in Meyaneh County